Sitaram Kattel popularly known by his serial name Dhurmus is a Nepalese scriptwriter, actor, comedian, director and social worker. He was one of the main characters of the Nepali TV series Meri Bassai. He also acted in the 2013 Nepali box office hit Chha Ekan Chha in a lead role along with Deepak Raj Giri, Kedar Ghimire, Neeta Dhungana, and Jeetu Nepal. His other movie Wada Number Chha was also a blockbuster. He is also an active social worker.

Social works 
Kattel has worked in earthquake relief. He and his spouse have built a residence for them and other earthquake victims. He is also building international cricket stadium in Chitwan (via Dhurmus Suntali Foundation).

Projects 
 Musahar Basti - Rebuild the village (Done)

Career
He started his career from a hit comedy show called Geetanjali, in which he worked as a temporary scriptwriter. He also worked in Jire Khursani, a famous Nepali comedy TV series for a while. After that along with Kedar Ghimire and Daman Rupakheti he created the sitcom Meri Bassai.

Filmography

Television
Geetanjali
Jire Khursani
Meri Bassai
Tito Satya

Films
Daud (2008)
Chha Ekan Chha (2013)
Nai Nabhannu La 2 (2014)
Woda Number 6 (2015)
Senti Virus (2020)

References

External links
 Official website

Living people
People from Solukhumbu District
Nepalese male television actors
21st-century Nepalese male actors
Nepalese male comedians
Nepalese film directors
Nepalese male film actors
1983 births
21st-century Nepalese screenwriters
Khas people